Calleida planulata is a species of ground beetle in the family Carabidae. It is found in North America.

Subspecies
These two subspecies belong to the species Calleida planulata:
 Calleida planulata atrata Bates, 1883
 Calleida planulata planulata LeConte, 1858

References

Further reading

 

Lebiinae
Articles created by Qbugbot
Beetles described in 1858